Vermont Township is one of twenty-six townships in Fulton County, Illinois, USA.  As of the 2010 census, its population was 974 and it contained 429 housing units.

Geography

Cities, towns, villages
 Table Grove (southeast half)
 Vermont

Cemeteries
The township contains these seven cemeteries: Bailey, Dobbins, Easley, Fleming, Quaker, Union Chapel and Vermont.

Major highways
  U.S. Route 136

Demographics

School districts
 Schuyler-Industry Community Unit School District 5
 V I T Community Unit School District 2

Political districts
 Illinois' 17th congressional district
 State House District 94
 State Senate District 47

References
 
 United States Census Bureau 2007 TIGER/Line Shapefiles
 United States National Atlas

External links
 City-Data.com
 Illinois State Archives

Townships in Fulton County, Illinois
Townships in Illinois